'Enrico Cortese  atleta professionista di mma

Biography
Born in Bassano del Grappa, Veneto, Cortese spent 2000-01 season at A.C. Milan youth team and played at 2001 Torneo Città di Arco. He then left for Veneto club Verona. In July 2003, he was transferred back to A.C. Milan in co-ownership deal, in exchange with ex-Milan team-mate Stefano Pastrello. Since 2004-05 season, he was loaned to Serie C2 clubs.

In 2008-09 season, he joined Serie D side Flaminia Civita Castellana, then Monterotondo in next season. In December 2009, he joined Morro d'Oro.

References

External links
 Profile at FIGC 
 Profile at calciatori.com 
 

Italian footballers
Hellas Verona F.C. players
A.C. Milan players
S.P.A.L. players
U.S. Viterbese 1908 players
A.S. Pizzighettone players
Association football midfielders
People from the Province of Vicenza
1985 births
Living people
Pol. Monterotondo Lupa players